Votchina  or otchina (о́тчина – from word Father) was an East Slavic land estate that could be inherited.  The term "votchina" was also used to describe the lands of a knyaz.

The term originated in the law of Kievan Rus.  An owner of votchina (votchinnik, вотчинник) not only had property rights to it, but also some administrative and legal power over people living on its territory.  These people, however, were not serfs, as they had a right to freely move to different votchinas.

Later the administrative and legal powers of the votchina owners were severely limited, and then completely revoked.  In the mid-15th century, the right of certain categories of peasants in some votchinas to leave their master was limited to a period of one week before and after the so-called Yuri's Day (November 26).

Society of Kievan Rus'